Pardubice is a city in the Czech Republic. It has about 89,000 inhabitants. It is the capital city of the Pardubice Region and lies on the Elbe River. The historic centre is well preserved and is protected as an urban monument reservation.

Pardubice is known as the centre of industry, which represents by an oil refinery or an electronic equipment plant. The city is well known for its sport events, which include the Great Pardubice Steeplechase in horse racing, the Golden Helmet of Pardubice in motorcycle racing, and the Czech Open international chess and games festival.

Administrative division
Pardubice is divided into eight boroughs, which are further divided into 27 administrative parts (in brackets):
Pardubice I (Bílé Předměstí (partly), Pardubice-Staré Město, Zámek, Zelené Předměstí (partly));
Pardubice II (Cihelna, Polabiny, Rosice (partly));
Pardubice III (Bílé Předměstí (partly), Studánka (partly));
Pardubice IV (Bílé Předměstí (partly), Černá za Bory, Drozdice, Mnětice, Nemošice, Pardubičky, Staročernsko, Studánka (partly), Žižín);
Pardubice V (Dražkovice, Nové Jesenčany, Zelené Předměstí (partly));
Pardubice VI (Lány na Důlku, Opočínek, Popkovice, Staré Čívice, Svítkov, Zelené Předměstí (partly));
Pardubice VII (Doubravice, Ohrazenice, Rosice (partly), Semtín, Trnová);
Pardubice VIII (Hostovice).

Etymology
The name Pardubice is derived from the personal Polish name Porydęb. It was the name of the leader of the monks who came here from Poland. For the first time the name was recorded in the form of Pordobice.

Geography
The city lies at the confluence of the Elbe and the Chrudimka rivers. There are several fish ponds, artificial lakes and oxbow lakes of the Elbe in the municipal territory.

Pardubice is located in the East Elbe Table lowland, in the eastern part of the Polabí lowlands.

History

The first written mention of Pardubice is from 1295, when Pope Boniface VIII took over the protection of the local Church of Saint Bartholomew with the order of Canons Regular of the Penitence of the Blessed Martyrs. In the first half of the 14th century, the settlement was acquired by a noble family, later known as Lords of Pardubice. In 1340, when Pardubice was inherited by Arnošt of Pardubice, it was first referred to as a city.

In 1491, Pardubice was bought by Vilém II of Pernštejn, who continued to expand the town and made significant impact on its prosperity. He chose Pardubice as the centre of his estate and began to build a city that corresponded to his status. The Pernštejn family had the entire historic centre with the Renaissance square built. They also had rebuilt the medieval castle into a comfortable fortified residence. In 1560, the Pernštejns were forced to sell the estate to Emperor Ferdinand I because of debts.

During the Thirty Years' War, the city was besieged by the army of General Lennart Torstensson, but was not conquered.

An important milestone in the history of the city was the year 1845, when the railway from Prague to Olomouc was finished. Pardubice became an important railway junction, which led to the development of the food, engineering and chemical industries, and subsequently the development of social and cultural life. In 1874, the Great Pardubice Steeplechase horse race took place for the first time. In 1910, Jan Kašpar made here the first successful flight in Czech lands and a year later he made history by flying the first long-haul flight from Pardubice to Prague.

Until 1918, the town was part of the Austrian monarchy (Austria side after the Austro-Hungarian Compromise of 1867), head of the Pardubitz district, one of the 94 Bezirkshauptmannschaften in Bohemia.

In the interwar period, Pardubice continued to develop, the heyday ended with the advent of World War II. During the war the city was damaged by air strikes of the Allies, and the Fanto Werke refinery was repeatedly bombed during the Oil campaign of World War II.

Demographics

Economy

Pardubice is known as an industrial city. The dominant industries are chemical industry, electrical engineering and mechanical engineering. Tesla electronics manufacturer operated here in 1921–1989. In 2000, Foxconn established a production plant in its former premises. This electronics manufacturer is the largest employer in Pardubice.

Pardubice has a long tradition in the chemical industry. It is represented by the Paramo refinery, which was founded by David Fanto in 1889. Today it is owned by Orlen Unipetrol. In Pardubice-Semtín there are the companies Explosia (a manufacturer of explosives founded in 1920, which is associated with the invention of Semtex plastic explosive) and its subsidiary Synthesia (manufacturer of cellulose, pigments and dyes, and organic compounds, established in 1929).

For centuries, Pardubice is known for the production of gingerbread. The gingerbread guild was established in the 16th century. The first factory was founded in 1913. Since 2008, Pardubice gingerbread is a protected geographical indication by the European Union.

Transport

Pardubice main railway station is an important railway junction. Pardubice has direct railway connection with many cities, including Prague, Olomouc, Ostrava, and Žilina and Košice in Slovakia.

Pardubice is served by Pardubice Airport, which is used as both military and civilian international airport.

Education
Pardubice is home to University of Pardubice. It was founded in 1950 as Chemical College and is mainly focused on fields historically associated with the city, such as the chemical industry and transportation.

Sport
The city was first represented in the top national football competition by SK Pardubice in the 1930s and 1940s. Later VCHZ Pardubice played in the top national league in the 1968–69 season. Nowadays the city is represented by FK Pardubice, which plays in the Czech First League. However, as of 2021/22, the team's stadium Pod Vinicí does not meet the criteria for holding first league matches. Women's team plays in the Czech Women's First League.

The ice hockey club HC Dynamo Pardubice plays in the Czech Extraliga. The team plays its home games at Enteria arena.

The basketball team is BK JIP Pardubice, playing in the National Basketball League.

Pardubice is also represented in the Czech rink bandy league.

Pardubice hosts two world-famous sporting events each year. The Great Pardubice Steeplechase was first held in 1874 and is one of the most famous horse races in Europe.

The second event is the Golden Helmet of Pardubice, a motorcycle speedway competition held at the Svítkov Stadium. The Golden Helmet has been run since 1929 is one of the most prestigious individual titles in world speedway outside of the Speedway World Championship or a riders national championship.

The Czech Open international chess and games festival has been held in Pardubice since 1990. The city was also known for the Czech Open in golf, but it was last held in 2011.

Sights

The landmark and symbol of Pardubice is the Green Gate as a remnant of the city's fortifications. It is a Renaissance gate with a façade decorated by a relief designed by Mikoláš Aleš, which depicts the Lords of Pardubice. In its interior there is also an exposition with the history and legends of the city.

Pardubice Castle was built at the end of the 13th century and rebuilt in the Renaissance style at the turn of the 15th and 16th centuries. Massive fortifications are preserved around the castle. Today the castle houses the Museum of East Bohemia in Pardubice and Gallery of East Bohemia in Pardubice.

The original Church of Saint Bartholomew was built in 1295 and destroyed during the Hussite Wars. The today's Church of Saint Bartholomew was built together with a monastery in 1507–1514. It was used as a burial place of the Pernštejn family. In the interior there is a valuable main altar with the painting "The Passion of St. Bartholomew" from 1692 by Michael Willmann and a painting decoration by Mikoláš Aleš.

The Church of the Annunciation of the Virgin Mary was founded by Arnošt of Pardubice before 1359. Its present late Gothic and Renaissance appearance dates from the first half of the 16th century. Until 1786, the church belonged to a Minorite monastery, from which time there are extensive underground tombs under the church.

The House at Jonáš is one of the most treasured burgher houses in Pardubice. It was built after the fire that hit the city in 1507. It is known for its façade, decorated with a stucco relief from 1797, showing a biblical scene of a whale swallowing the prophet Jonah. The premises of the house are used by the Gallery of East Bohemia in Pardubice.

The Zámeček Memorial is a place of reverence that commemorates execution of 194 people in 1942. The place is a national cultural monument and at its centrepiece is a granite monument dating from 1949.

Notable people

Gustav Gärtner (1855–1937), pathologist
Božena Viková-Kunětická (1862–1934), politician, writer, and feminist
František Lexa (1876–1960), Egyptologist
Vilém Mathesius (1882–1945), linguist and writer
Jan Kašpar (1883–1927), aviator and aircraft constructor
Emil Artur Longen (1885–1936), playwright, actor and screenwriter
Oskar Brázda (1887–1977), painter
Emanuela Nohejlová-Prátová (1900–1995), numismatist; died here
Věra Vovsová (1912–1998), painter, lived here
Jan Tauc (1922–2010), Czech-American physicist
Petr Haničinec (1930–2007), actor
Jiří Gruša (1938–2011), poet, prose writer and translator
Vladimír Nadrchal (born 1938), ice hockey player
Alois Švehlík (born 1939), actor
Petr Kabeš (1941–2005), poet
Stanislav Prýl (1942–2015), ice hockey player
Jiří Crha (born 1950), ice hockey player
Otakar Janecký (born 1960), ice hockey player and coach 
Hynek Kmoníček (born 1962), diplomat
Ivo Křen (1964–2020), graphic artist and glass art theoretician
Roman Prymula (born 1964), physician, epidemiologist and politician
Dominik Hašek (born 1965), ice hockey player
Edita Adlerová (born 1971), mezzo-soprano
Tereza Maxová (born 1971), model
Radek Baborák (born 1976), French horn player and conductor
Nora Fridrichová (born 1977), television presenter
Lukáš Wagenknecht (born 1978), economist and politician
Jan Bulis (born 1978), ice hockey player
Jiří Welsch (born 1980), basketball player
Michal Meduna (born 1981), footballer
Aleš Hemský (born 1983), ice hockey player
Filip Bandžak (born 1983), opera singer, baritone
Iva Kramperová (born 1984), classical violinist
Tomáš Nosek (born 1992), ice hockey player
Kovy (born 1996), youtuber
Filip Zadina (born 1999), ice hockey player

Twin towns – sister cities

Pardubice is twinned with:

 Bełchatów, Poland
 Çanakkale, Turkey
 Doetinchem, Netherlands
 Merano, Italy
 Pernik, Bulgaria
 Rosignano Marittimo, Italy
 Selb, Germany
 Skellefteå, Sweden
 Vysoké Tatry, Slovakia

Cooperation agreements
Pardubice also cooperates with:

 East Lothian, Scotland, United Kingdom
 Golegã, Portugal
 Jerez de la Frontera, Spain
 Sežana, Slovenia
 Waregem, Belgium
 Wrocław, Poland

References

External links

Official tourist information portal
Two legends of Pardubice

 
Cities and towns in the Czech Republic
Oil campaign of World War II
Populated places in Pardubice District
Populated riverside places in the Czech Republic
Populated places on the Elbe